The 1984 Florida State Seminoles football team represented Florida State University in the 1984 NCAA Division I-A football season. The team was coached by Bobby Bowden and played their home games at Doak Campbell Stadium.

Running back Greg Allen became the first Heisman finalist at Florida State, finishing in seventh place.

Schedule

Roster

Season summary

East Carolina

Kansas

Miami (FL)

Jessie Hester 5 Rec, 116 Yds

Temple

Memphis State

Auburn

Tulane

Arizona State

Greg Allen 22 Rush, 223 Yds
Jessie Hester 3 Rec, 104 Yds

South Carolina

Chattanooga

Florida

vs. Georgia (Citrus Bowl)

References

Florida State
Florida State Seminoles football seasons
Florida State Seminoles football